The 1998 British Open Championships was held at the National Indoor Arena in Birmingham, from 27 March - 5 April 1998. Peter Nicol won the title defeating Jansher Khan in the final. This win put an end to Khan's six year winning streak.

Seeds

Draw and results

Final Qualifying round

+ Lucky loser

Main draw

References

Men's British Open Squash Championships
Squash in England
Men's British Open
Men's British Open Squash Championship
Men's British Open Squash Championship
Men's British Open Squash Championship
1990s in Birmingham, West Midlands
Sports competitions in Birmingham, West Midlands